These are the Official Charts Company UK Official Indie Chart number one hits of 2004.

See also
2004 in British music

References

United Kingdom Independent Singles
Indie 2004
2004 in British music